Andres Skuin (3 December 1962 – 8 January 2003) was an Estonian volleyballer and coach.

He was born in Võru. In 1985 he graduated from the University of Tartu's Institute of Physical Education.

He began his volleyball career in 1973, coached by Aksel Saal. He played at Tallinna Autobussikoondis team (Estonian champion in 1990).

He started his coaching career in 1985. In 2000 he was the head coach of Estonia women's national volleyball team, and 2001-2003 Estonia men's national volleyball team.

In 2002 he was awarded the state sport prize.

References

1962 births
2003 deaths
Estonian men's volleyball players
Estonian volleyball coaches
University of Tartu alumni
Sportspeople from Võru
Volleyball coaches of international teams